Charities and relief agencies raised over $657 million in the three weeks following the September 11, 2001 attacks, the vast bulk going to immediate survivors and victims' families.

Government assistance 
On September 21, 2001, the Congress approved a bill to aid the airline industry and establish a federal fund for victims. The cost of the mostly open-ended fund reached $7 billion. Victims of earlier terrorist attacks, including those linked to al-Qaida, were not included in the fund, nor were those who would not surrender the right to hold the airlines legally responsible.

American Red Cross 
From the donations to the Emergency Relief Fund, as of 19 November 2001, the American Red Cross granted 3,165 checks to 2,776 families totaling $54.3 million.

172,612 cases were referred to mental health contacts. The 866-GET INFO number received 29,820 calls. As of 3:10 p.m. November 20, 2001, there had been 1,592,295 blood donations since September 11.

Fire Donations took charitable contributions on behalf of firefighters, EMS, and rescue workers.

Other charitable drives 
 In the Washington, D.C. area (Baltimore-Washington Metropolitan Area), Giant Food offered to match contributions made in-store up to $1 million.
 For the families of the 79 employees of the Windows of the World Restaurant: Windows of Hope Family Relief Fund, c/o David Berdon & Company, 415 Madison Avenue, New York, NY 10017.
 Arista Records re-released singer Whitney Houston's recording of "The Star Spangled Banner" as a charity single following the attacks, with all profits going towards the firefighters and victims of the attacks. Mariah Carey also recorded a charity single, "Never Too Far/Hero Medley", released on the Virgin Records label.
 In Ireland, the National Fire Brigade Committee opened a disaster fund to raise money for the families of those injured or killed in the attacks.
 Pop singer Britney Spears donated $1 to the children of firefighters, police officers and EMT's who were killed on 9/11 from every ticket sold from her Dream Within a Dream Tour in 2001 and 2002.

Emergency supplies 
On Thursday and Friday, September 14–15 September 2001, various relief supplies for the World Trade Center relief effort were collected from the New York City area, and dropped off at the Javits Convention Center or at a staging area at Union Square. By Saturday morning, enough supplies (and volunteers) were collected.

Memorial funds 
Many families and friends of victims have set up memorial funds and projects to give back to their communities and change the world in honor of their loved ones' lives. Examples include:

 Beyond the 11th
 The Peter M. Goodrich Memorial Foundation
 Our Voices Together
 September 11th Families for Peaceful Tomorrows
 Heroic Choices (originally the Todd M. Beamer Foundation)
 Tuesday's Children

See also
 September 11th Victim Compensation Fund

References 

Aftermath of the September 11 attacks
Charity in the United States